The surnames  Stach, Štach or von Stach have multiple origins. Notable people include:

Aleksandra Stach (born 2000), Polish canoeist
David Stach (born 1992), Czech ice hockey player
Eric Stach, American materials scientist
Georg Stach (1912–1943), German racing cyclist
Ilse von Stach (1879–1941), German writer
Jagoda Stach (born 1983), Polish child actress
Lubomír Štach (born 1986), Czech ice hockey player
Matthäus Stach (1711–1787), Moravian missionary
Miroslav Stach, Czechoslovak canoeist
Reiner Stach (born 1951), German author

References

See also

Czech-language surnames
Polish-language surnames
German-language surnames
fr:Stach